The Department of Peace Operations (DPO) (French: Département des opérations de maintien de la paix) is a department of the United Nations charged with the planning, preparation, management and direction of UN peacekeeping operations. Previously known as the Department for Peacekeeping Operations (DPKO), it was created on 1 January 2019 as part of a restructuring of the UN's peace and security apparatus. The DPO retains the core functions and responsibilities of its predecessor, with a greater emphasis on cohesion, integrating different resources and knowledge, and promoting human rights.

With an annual budget of roughly $6.5 billion, the DPO is the largest UN agency by expenditure, exceeding the UN's own regular budget. As of March 2020, it oversees 81,370 personnel serving in thirteen peacekeeping missions.

History
The DPO traces its roots to 1948 with the creation of the United Nations Military Observer Group for India and Pakistan (UNMOGIP) and the United Nations Truce Supervision Organization (UNTSO). Up to the late 1980s, peacekeeping missions were operated by six officials in the United Nations Office of Special Political Affairs, which was headed first by Under-Secretary-General Ralph Bunche, and subsequently Brian Urquhart and Marrack Goulding. From the beginning, peacekeeping operations  operated with a clear doctrine that applied to its traditional or classical peacekeeping operations for inter-state ceasefires: peacekeepers did not take sides or discharge firearms, save in self-defense, or meddle in politics.

The Department of Peacekeeping Operations was created in March 1992 when Boutros Boutros-Ghali took office as Secretary-General of the United Nations; its creation was one of his first decisions. In organisational terms, it upgraded and expanded upon the work of the previous Field Administration and Logistics Division (FALD) (which remained active as a subordinate department). Goulding became under-secretary-general (or USG) for peacekeeping with Kofi Annan appointed as his deputy. The role of the DPKO, however, wasn't clarified until June 1992, when Boutrous-Ghali issued An Agenda for Peace, a plan to strengthen the UN's capacity for preventive diplomacy and peacekeeping.

French nationals have served as Under-Secretaries-General for Peacekeeping Operations since 1997.

Organizational structure

DPO is split into two main offices: the Office of Operations and the Office of Mission Support (OMS).

Included within the Office of Mission Support are the logistics and administrative divisions, which provide logistics, personnel, and financial support services to DPO missions.  OMS is responsible for determining financial reimbursement to UN member states for their contribution of Contingent owned equipment, troops, and services to peacekeeping missions. Letters of Assist are an important part of this. Also part of DPO are Mine Action, Training, Best Practices, and Military and Police Divisions.

A March 2007 United Nations General Assembly Resolution titled “Strengthening the capacity of the Organization in Peacekeeping Operations” has called for the re-structuring of the department and the establishment of a separate Department of Field Support. Whereas the new entity serves as a key enabler by coordinating the administration and logistics in UN peacekeeping operations, DPO concentrates on policy planning and providing strategic directions.

This re-organisation was paralleled by a DPO reform effort launched in 2005 entitled 'Peace Operations 2010', which further pursues reforms initiated by the 'Brahimi Report' Report of the Panel on United Nations Peacekeeping Operations. This included an increase in personnel, the harmonization of the conditions of service of field and headquarters staff, the development of guidelines and standard operating procedures, and improving the partnership arrangement between the Department of Peace Operations (DPO) and the United Nations Development Programme (UNDP), African Union and European Union. One area of this reform effort has been the development of clearer internal doctrine or guidance for UN peacekeeping. The highest level DPO doctrine document was issued in 2008, known as the 'capstone' doctrine.

Very recently with the newest reform efforts, Secretary-General Guterres has made efforts to streamline peacekeeping efforts to conserve finances, and eliminate excess and unnecessary roles. Shared regional divisions of the DPA and DPO will restructure and remove duplication of tasks, allowing for more manpower to be available for new initiates and existing operations. This gives the department more resources and responsibilities for broader peace building efforts, which are of course by their nature linked to political analysis and strategy (Cliffe, 2018). While peacekeeping operations are at an all-time high, and funding continues to receive budget cuts, efficiency measures will allow peacekeeping operations to remain intact. Removing duplications will allow for a wider spectrum of support to be available for troops on the ground.

List of heads
The following is a chronological list of those who have held the position of Under-Secretary-General for Peacekeeping Operations:

Financing
The bulk of peacekeeping operations funding is appropriated much like the general budget, but permanent members of the Security Council are required to pay a larger share, and all states are free to contribute additional funding, equipment, or other services to missions of their respective choices.

Current operations
As of 2010, DPO leads 16 different missions in Africa, the Caribbean, the Middle East, Americas, Europe and Asia. Serving in these missions are over 100,000 uniformed and civilian personnel.   Total approved annual expenses are over US$5 billion for the period July 2006 to June 2007.

"The Surge"
At an October 2006 press conference,  then USG Jean-Marie Guéhenno announced that peacekeeping operations had reached an all-time high, and will continue to expand as UNIFIL and UNMIT reach full strength, and if a UN mission enters Darfur.

See also
List of United Nations peacekeeping missions

References

Further reading
 Koops, Joachim Alexander, et al., eds. The Oxford handbook of United Nations peacekeeping operations (Oxford UP, 2015).
 Curran, David, and Paul D. Williams. "The United Kingdom and United Nations peace operations." International Peacekeeping 23.5 (2016): 630-651. online
 Di Salvatore, Jessica, et al. "Introducing the peacekeeping mandates (PEMA) dataset." Social Science Research Network (2020). online
 Dorn, A. Walter, and Robin Collins. "Peacekeeping works: The UN can help end civil wars." International Journal 75.1 (2020): 95-103. online
 Druckman, Daniel, Grace Mueller, and Paul F. Diehl. "Exploring the Compatibility of Multiple Missions in UN Peace Operations." International Peacekeeping (2020): 1-30. [ online]
 Gromes, Thorsten. "Does peacekeeping only work in easy environments? An analysis of conflict characteristics, mission profiles, and civil war recurrence." 'Contemporary security policy 40.4 (2019): 459-480. online
 Mobekk, Eirin. UN Peace Operations: Lessons from Haiti, 1994-2016 (Routledge, 2016).
 Mulder, Nicholas. The Economic Weapon: The Rise of Sanctions as a Tool of Modern War (2022) excerpt
 Tardy, Thierry. "France: the unlikely return to UN peacekeeping." International peacekeeping'' 23.5 (2016): 610-629,

External links
Records of the Department of Peacekeeping Operations (DPKO), Office of the Under-Secretary-General (OUSG) at the United Nations Archives
United Nations Department of Peacekeeping Operations Official Website
United Nations Rule of Law: The Department of Peacekeeping Operations, on the rule of law work conducted by the Department of Peacekeeping Operations.
 SPIA - Soldiers of Peace International Association
 

Government agencies established in 1992
United Nations peacekeeping
Military operations other than war
United Nations Secretariat